Archduke Georg von Habsburg (born 16 December 1964) is a Hungarian diplomat.

He is referred to in Austria as Georg Habsburg-Lothringen, in Hungary as Habsburg György, and in most international media as Archduke Georg of Austria.

Family ties 
Born in Germany as Paul Georg Maria Joseph Dominikus, he is the second son, and seventh and youngest child of Otto von Habsburg, the last Crown Prince of Austria-Hungary, and his wife Regina. His father, heir of Charles I and IV, last monarch of Austria-Hungary, renounced all claims to the Austrian throne in 1961. Georg von Habsburg was raised at his parents' home in exile, Villa Austria, in Pöcking, Bavaria.

He married Duchess Eilika of Oldenburg (born 22 August 1972 in Bad Segeberg), the older daughter of Duke Johann of Oldenburg (younger son of Nikolaus, Hereditary Grand Duke of Oldenburg and his wife Princess Helena of Waldeck and Pyrmont) and Countess Ilka of Ortenburg, on 18 October 1997 in Budapest, Hungary, contracting, unlike his elder brother Karl in 1993, a dynastic marriage according to the former Habsburg house laws. His wife remained Lutheran. The couple have three children:
 Zsófia Mária Tatjána Mónika Erzsébet Katalin (Sophie Maria Tatiana Monica Elisabeth Catherine, born 12 January 2001 in Budapest)
 Ildikó Mária Walburga (Hilda Maria Walburga, born 6 June 2002 in Budapest)
 Károly-Konstantin Mihály István Mária (Karl-Konstantin Michael Stephan Maria, born 20 July 2004 in Budapest)

Georg and his family live near the village of Sóskút, in Pest County in Hungary. Their eldest child was the first Habsburg to be born in Hungary in more than fifty years. While Georg is a Roman Catholic, Eilika has chosen to remain a Lutheran.

Career 
Georg was the President of Red Cross in Hungary, having been named Hungary's Ambassador extraordinary to the European Parliament in 1996.

In December 2020 he was named as Hungary's Ambassador to France.

Honours and awards

References

External links
 Grand Europe Ball

Georg
Ambassadors of Hungary to France
German Roman Catholics
Austrian Roman Catholics
Hungarian Roman Catholics
Hungarian people of Austrian descent
Hungarian people of German descent
Knights of the Golden Fleece of Austria
1964 births
Living people
People from Starnberg
Austrian princes